Gogodala Rural LLG is a local-level government (LLG) of Western Province, Papua New Guinea. The Gogodala-Suki languages, Dibiyaso, and Turumsa are mostly spoken within this LLG.

Wards
01. Ali
02. Makapa (Turumsa language and Dibiyaso language speakers)
03. Isago
04. Pikiwa (Dibiyaso language speakers)
05. Wasapea (Kamula language speakers)
06. Pisi
07. Semabo
08. Awaba
09. Dadi
10. Aketa
11. Kawito Station
12. Kotale
13. Kewa
14. Tai
15. Dogona
16. Adiba
17. Yau
18. Ike
19. Kini
20. Waligi
21. Kimama
22. Bamutsa (Dibiyaso language speakers)
23. Uladu
24. Ugu
25. Kenewa
26. Waya
27. Kubu
28. Duaba
29. Konedobu
30. Pagona
31. Dede
32. Sialoa
33. Kawiyapo
34. Uric
35. Aduru (Makayam language speakers)
36. Baramula (Baramu language speakers)
37. Tapila (Abom language and Baramu language speakers)
38. Lewada (Abom language and Makayam language speakers)
39. Dewara (Abom language and Were language speakers)

References

Local-level governments of Western Province (Papua New Guinea)